Governor Fletcher may refer to:

Allen M. Fletcher (1853–1922), 54th Governor of Vermont
Benjamin Fletcher (1640–1703), Colonial Governor of New York from 1692 to 1697
Ernie Fletcher (born 1952), 60th Governor of Kentucky
Murchison Fletcher (1878–1954), Acting Governor of British Ceylon from 1927 to 1928, Governor of Fiji from 1929 to 1936, and Governor of Trinidad and Tobago from 1936 to 1938
Reginald Fletcher, 1st Baron Winster (1885–1961), Governor of Cyprus from 1946 to 1949
Ryland Fletcher (1799–1885), 24th Governor of Vermont
Thomas Fletcher (Arkansas politician) (1817–1880), Acting Governor of Arkansas in 1862
Thomas Clement Fletcher (1827–1899), 18th Governor of Missouri